The 1939 Illinois Fighting Illini football team was an American football team that represented the University of Illinois during the 1939 Big Ten Conference football season.  In their 27th season under head coach Robert Zuppke, the Illini compiled a 3–4–1 record and finished in sixth place in the Big Ten Conference. Bill Lenich was selected as the team's most valuable player.

Schedule

References

Illinois
Illinois Fighting Illini football seasons
Illinois Fighting Illini football